Gert-Arne Nilsson (born 31 October 1941) is a Swedish former footballer who played as a defender.

References

Association football defenders
Swedish footballers
Allsvenskan players
Malmö FF players
1941 births
Living people